The men's 4 × 400 metres relay at the 2018 IAAF World U20 Championships will be held at Ratina Stadium on 14 and 15 July.

Records

Results

Heats

Qualification: First 2 of each heat ( Q ) plus the 2 fastest times ( q ) qualified for the final.

Final

References

4 x 400 metres relay
Relays at the World Athletics U20 Championships